The 1846–47 United States House of Representatives elections  were held on various dates in various states between August 2, 1846 and November 2, 1847. Each state set its own date for its elections to the House of Representatives. 228 elected members representing 29 states took their seats when the first session of the 30th United States Congress convened December 6, 1847. The new states of Iowa and Texas elected their first representatives during this election cycle. These elections were held during President James K. Polk's term.

The Whigs gained 37 seats to win 116 and a change in partisan control, while the rival Democrats lost 30, falling to 112. The Whigs gained seats in the Mid-Atlantic and the South. The nativist and anti-Catholic American Party was reduced to one seat. One Independent, Amos Tuck, was elected from New Hampshire.

The Mexican–American War, which the incumbent House had voted overwhelmingly to approve, was the main issue. The war had much stronger voter support in the West, South, and among Democrats than in the East, North, and among Whigs.

It was widely, accurately believed that war with Mexico would be won with large territorial gains. The Wilmot Proviso was the first congressional attempt to address slavery in these projected new territories, by proposing to ban it. Congress rejected the Wilmot Proviso, but not quickly or smoothly. Protracted debate aggravated sectional tensions. The repeated failure of Congress, and later also the President and Supreme Court, over the next decade to resolve the issue of slavery in the territories was a major cause of the Civil War.

This was the last time the Whig Party won a House majority, though candidates opposed to the Democratic Party would win a large majority in the realigning 1854 election. Notable freshmen included Abraham Lincoln of Illinois, elected as a Whig to his only term.

Election summaries
The trend toward single-member districts culminated as no multi-member districts featured.

In 1845, partly motivated by the successful 1844 test of the electric telegraph between Washington and Baltimore, Congress established a uniform date for choosing Presidential electors. Gradually, states aligned nearly all elections with this date, though as of this election, only three states had done so.

Two seats were added for the new State of Wisconsin. Wisconsin was unrepresented for most of the first session.

Special elections 

|-
! 
| Washington Poe
|  | Democratic
| 1844
|  | Member-elect declined the seat.New member elected January 5, 1846.Democratic hold.
| nowrap | 

|-
! 
| Sterling Price
|  | Democratic
| 1844
|  | Incumbent resigned August 12, 1846 to serve in the Mexican–American War.New member elected in 1846 and seated December 7, 1846.Democratic hold.Successor had not been elected to the next term, see below.
| nowrap | 

|-
! 
| Archibald Yell
|  | Democratic
| 18361840 1844
|  | Incumbent resigned July 1, 1846 to serve in the United States Volunteers.New member elected December 14, 1846.Whig gain.Successor seated February 6, 1847.Successor had not been elected to the next term, see below.
| nowrap | 

|-
! 
| Edward D. Baker
|  | Whig
| 1844
|  | Incumbent resigned January 15, 1847 to join the Illinois Volunteer Infantry.New member elected January 20, 1847 to finish the term.Whig hold.Successor had not been a candidate to the next term, see below.
| nowrap | 

|-
! 
| Edward Bradley
| 
| 1846
|  | Incumbent died August 5, 1847.New member elected November 2, 1847.Democratic hold.
| nowrap | 

|-
! 

|-
! 

|}

Alabama 

Elections were held August 2, 1847, after the March 4, 1847 beginning of the term, but before the House first convened in December 1847.

|-
! 

|-
! 

|-
! 

|-
! 

|-
! 

|-
! 

|-
! 

|}

Arkansas 

Arkansas elected its sole member August 3, 1846.

|-
! 
| Archibald Yell
|  | Democratic
| 18361840 1844
|  | Incumbent resigned July 1, 1846 to serve in the United States Volunteers.New member elected.Democratic hold.Winner was not elected to finish the current term.
| nowrap | 

|}

Connecticut 

Elections were held April 5, 1847, after the March 4, 1847 beginning of the term, but before the House first convened in December 1847.

|-
! 

|-
! 

|-
! 

|-
! 

|}

Delaware 

The election was held November 10, 1846.

|-
! 

|}

Florida 

The election was held October 5, 1846.

|-
! 
| William H. Brockenbrough
|  | Democratic
| 1845 
|  | Incumbent retired.New member elected.Whig gain.
| nowrap | 

|}

Georgia 

Elections were held October 5, 1846.

|-
! 

|-
! 

|-
! 

|-
! 

|-
! 

|-
! 

|-
! 

|-
! 

|}

Illinois 

Elections were held August 3, 1846.

|-
! 

|-
! 

|-
! 

|-
! 

|-
! 

|-
! 

|-
! 
| Edward D. Baker
|  | Whig
| 1844
|  | Incumbent retired.New member elected.Whig hold.Incumbent then resigned early, leading to a special election. 
| nowrap | 

|}

Indiana 

Elections were held August 2, 1847, after the March 4, 1847 beginning of the term, but before the House first convened in December 1847.

|-
! 

|-
! 

|-
! 

|-
! 

|-
! 

|-
! 

|-
! 

|-
! 

|-
! 

|-
! 

|}

Iowa

Elections to the 29th Congress 

Elections for the new state were held October 26, 1846.

|-
! rowspan=2 | 
| colspan=3 | New state
| rowspan=2 nowrap | 
|-
| colspan=3 | New state
|  | New seat.New member elected October 26, 1846.Democratic gain.Winner (Hastings) would not be a candidate for the next term, see below.

|}

Elections to the 30th Congress 

Elections were held August 2, 1847, after the March 4, 1847 beginning of the term, but before the House first convened in December 1847.

|-
! 
| colspan=3 | New seat
|  | New district.New member elected.Democratic gain.
| nowrap | 

|-
! rowspan=2 | 
| Shepherd Leffler
|  | Democratic
| 1846
| Incumbent re-elected.
| rowspan=2 nowrap | 

|-
| S. Clinton Hastings
|  | Democratic
| 1846
|  | Incumbent retired.Democratic loss.

|}

Kentucky 

Elections were held August 2, 1847, after the March 4, 1847 beginning of the term, but before the House first convened in December 1847.

|-
! 

|-
! 

|-
! 

|-
! 

|-
! 

|-
! 

|-
! 

|-
! 

|-
! 

|-
! 

|}

Louisiana 

Elections were held November 2, 1847, after the March 4, 1847 beginning of the term, but before the House first convened in December 1847.

|-
! 

|-
! 

|-
! 

|-
! 

|}

Maine 

Elections were held September 14, 1846.

|-
! 

|-
! 

|-
! 

|-
! 

|-
! 

|-
! 

|-
! 

|}

Maryland 

Elections were held October 6, 1847 elections were after the March 4, 1847 beginning of the new term, but still before the Congress convened in December 1847.

|-
! 

|-
! 

|-
! 

|-
! 

|-
! 

|-
! 

|}

Massachusetts 

Elections were held November 9, 1846.

|-
! 

|-
! 

|-
! 

|-
! 

|-
! 

|-
! 

|-
! 
| Julius Rockwell
|  | Whig
| 1844 
| Incumbent re-elected.
| nowrap | 

|-
! 
| John Quincy Adams
|  | Whig
| 1830
| Incumbent re-elected.
| nowrap | 

|-
! 

|-
! 

|}

Michigan 

Elections were held November 3, 1846.

|-
! 
| Robert McClelland
| 
| 1843
| Incumbent re-elected.
| nowrap | 

|-
! 
| John S. Chipman
| 
| 1844
|  | Incumbent retired.New member elected.Democratic hold.
| nowrap | 

|-
! 
| James B. Hunt
| 
| 1843
|  | Incumbent retired.New member elected.Democratic hold.
| nowrap | 

|}

Mississippi 

Elections were held November 1–2, 1847, after the March 4, 1847 beginning of the term, but before the House first convened in December 1847.

|-
! 
| Jacob Thompson
|  | Democratic
| 1839
|  | Incumbent redistricted from the .Democratic hold.
| nowrap | 

|-
! 
| colspan=3 | None (new district)
|  | New member elected.Democratic gain.
| nowrap | 

|-
! 
| Robert W. Roberts
|  | Democratic
| 1843
|  | Incumbent redistricted from the .New member elected.Whig gain.
| nowrap | 

|-
! 
| colspan=3 | None (new district)
|  | New member elected.Democratic gain.
| nowrap | 

|}

Missouri 

Elections were held August 2, 1846.  All five seats remained Democratic.  Three of the members retired.

|-
! 
| James B. Bowlin
|  | Democratic
| 1842
| Incumbent re-elected.
| nowrap | 

|-
! rowspan=2 | 
| William McDaniel
|  | Democratic
| 1846 
|  | Incumbent retired.New member elected.Democratic hold.
| rowspan=2 nowrap | 
|-
| James Hugh Relfe
|  | Democratic
| 1842
|  | Incumbent retired.Democratic loss.

|-
! 
| colspan=3 | New district
|  | New seat.New member elected.Democratic gain.
| nowrap | 

|-
! 
| colspan=3 | New district
|  | New seat.New member elected.Democratic gain.
| nowrap | 

|-
! rowspan=2 | 
| John S. Phelps
|  | Democratic
| 1844
| Incumbent re-elected.
| rowspan=2 nowrap | 
|-
| Leonard H. Sims
|  | Democratic
| 1844
|  | Incumbent retired.Democratic loss.

|}

New Hampshire 

Elections were held March 9, 1847, after the March 4, 1847 beginning of the term, but before the House first convened in December 1847. Two of the districts had run-off elections in July 1847.

|-
! 
| colspan=3 | Vacant seat due to the failure to elect.
|  | New member elected on the second ballot.Independent gain.
| nowrap | 

|-
! 
| Moses Norris Jr.
|  | Democratic
| 1843
|  | Incumbent retired.New member elected.Democratic hold.
| nowrap | 

|-
! 
| Mace Moulton
|  | Democratic
| 1845
|  | Incumbent lost re-election.New member elected on the second ballot.Democratic hold.
| nowrap | 

|-
! 
| James Hutchins Johnson
|  | Democratic
| 1845
| Incumbent re-elected.
| nowrap | 

|}

New Jersey 

Elections were held November 3, 1846.

|-
! 

|-
! 

|-
! 

|-
! 

|-
! 

|}

New York 

Elections were held November 3, 1846.

|-
! 

|-
! 

|-
! 

|-
! 

|-
! 

|-
! 

|-
! 

|-
! 

|-
! 

|-
! 

|-
! 

|-
! 

|-
! 

|-
! 

|-
! 

|-
! 

|-
! 

|-
! 

|-
! 

|-
! 

|-
! 

|-
! 

|-
! 

|-
! 

|-
! 

|-
! 

|-
! 

|-
! 

|-
! 

|-
! 

|-
! 

|-
! 

|-
! 

|-
! 

|}

North Carolina 

Elections were held August 5, 1847, after the March 4, 1847 beginning of the term, but before the House first convened in December 1847.

|-
! 

|-
! 

|-
! 

|-
! 

|-
! 

|-
! 

|-
! 

|-
! 

|-
! 

|}

Ohio 

Elections were held October 13, 1846.

|-
! 

|-
! 

|-
! 

|-
! 

|-
! 

|-
! 

|-
! 

|-
! 

|-
! 

|-
! 

|-
! 

|-
! 

|-
! 

|-
! 

|-
! 

|-
! 

|-
! 

|-
! 

|-
! 

|-
! 

|-
! 

|}

Pennsylvania 

Elections were held October 13, 1846.

|-
! 

|-
! 

|-
! 

|-
! 

|-
! 

|-
! 

|-
! 

|-
! 

|-
! 

|-
! 

|-
! 

|-
! 

|-
! 

|-
! 

|-
! 

|-
! 

|-
! 

|-
! 

|-
! 

|-
! 

|-
! 

|-
! 

|-
! 

|-
! 

|}

Rhode Island 

Elections were held April 7, 1847, after the March 4, 1847 beginning of the term, but before the House first convened in December 1847.

|-
! 

|-
! 

|}

South Carolina 

Elections were held October 12–13, 1846.

|-
! 

|-
! 

|-
! 

|-
! 

|-
! 

|-
! 

|-
! 

|}

Tennessee 

Elections were held August 2, 1847.

|-
! 
| Andrew Johnson
|  | Democratic
| 1842
| Incumbent re-elected.
| nowrap | 

|-
! 
| William M. Cocke
|  | Whig
| 1845
| Incumbent re-elected.
| nowrap | 

|-
! 
| John H. Crozier
|  | Whig
| 1845
| Incumbent re-elected.
| nowrap | 

|-
! 
| Alvan Cullom
|  | Democratic
| 1842
|  |Incumbent retired.New member elected.Democratic hold.
| nowrap | 

|-
! 
| George W. Jones
|  | Democratic
| 1842
| Incumbent re-elected.
| nowrap | 

|-
! 
| Barclay Martin
|  | Democratic
| 1845
|  |Incumbent retired.New member elected.Democratic hold.
| nowrap | 

|-
! 
| Meredith P. Gentry
|  | Whig
| 1845
| Incumbent re-elected.
| nowrap | 

|-
! 
| Edwin H. Ewing
|  | Whig
| 1845 (special)
|  |Incumbent retired.New member elected.Whig hold.
| nowrap | 

|-
! 
| Lucien B. Chase
|  | Democratic
| 1845 
| Incumbent re-elected.
| nowrap | 

|-
! 
| Frederick P. Stanton
|  | Democratic
| 1845
| Incumbent re-elected.
| nowrap | 

|-
! 
| Milton Brown
|  | Whig
| 1841 
|  |Incumbent retired.New member elected.Whig hold.
| nowrap | 

|}

Texas

29th Congress 

Elections for the 29th Congress were held in March 1846.

|-
! 
| colspan=3 | New state
|  | New seat.New member elected.Democratic gain.Winner was also elected to the next term, see below.
| nowrap | 

|-
! 
| colspan=3 | New state
|  | New seat.New member elected.Democratic gain.Winner was also elected to the next term, see below.
| nowrap | 

|}

30th Congress 

Elections for the 30th United States Congress were held November 2, 1846.

|-
! 
| David S. Kaufman
|  | Democratic
| 1846
| Incumbent re-elected.
| nowrap | 

|-
! 
| Timothy Pilsbury
|  | Democratic
| 1846
| Incumbent re-elected.
| nowrap | 

|}

Vermont 

Elections were held September 1, 1846.

|-
! 

|-
! 

|-
! 

|-
! 

|}

Virginia 

Elections were held April 22, 1847, after the March 4, 1847 beginning of the term, but before the House first convened in December 1847.

|-
! 

|-
! 

|-
! 

|-
! 

|-
! 

|-
! 

|-
! 

|-
! 

|-
! 

|-
! 

|-
! 

|-
! 

|-
! 

|-
! 

|-
! 

|}

Wisconsin Territory 
See Non-voting delegates, below.

Non-voting delegates 

|-
! 
| Morgan Lewis Martin
|  | Democratic
| 1844 or 1845
|  | Incumbent was not renominated.New member elected.Whig gain.
|  nowrap | 

|}

See also
 1846 United States elections
 List of United States House of Representatives elections (1824–1854)
 1846–47 United States Senate elections
 29th United States Congress
 30th United States Congress

Notes

References

Bibliography

External links
 Office of the Historian (Office of Art & Archives, Office of the Clerk, U.S. House of Representatives)